Romolo Valentino Benedetto Nati (born February 14, 1968) is an Italian architect and businessman who employs his knowledge in biomimicry to create sustainable real-estate and energy projects. He is the Executive Chairman and CEO of Italpinas Development Corporation (IDC), an Italian-Filipino real-estate development firm.  He is also the Vice Chairman of Constellation Energy Corporation (CEC), a Philippine renewable energy company, and  the Chairman of  Damiani Property Management and Services, Inc., the leasing company of IDC.

Career

Italpinas Development Corporation 

In 2007, Nati came to the Philippines and introduced "green architecture". In 2009, Nati and Jose D. Leviste III, founded Italpinas Euroasian Design and Eco-development Corporation (ITPI). Leviste is a Sydney-based Filipino lawyer.

ITPI was later renamed Italpinas Development Corporation (IDC), with Nati as Executive Chairman and Chief Executive Officer and Leviste as President. The first project of the IDC is Primavera Residences in Cagayan de Oro, Philippines. Primavera is a mixed-use condominium inside Pueblo de Oro Business Park.

Constellation Energy Corporation 

Also founded in 2009, Romolo is Vice Chairman of Constellation Energy Corporation (CEC), a renewable energy company that focuses in acquiring, financing and developing small to medium-scale renewable energy projects across the Philippines.

Damiani Property Management and Services, Inc. 
Romolo V. Nati is also the chairman of Damiani Property Management and Services, Inc. (DPMSi), a company engaged in asset and property management of real estate projects.

Style

Biomimicry 

Inspired by natural living structures, Nati based his designs on biomimicry. He also took an interest in sustainable development, citing a strong need for building cities and creating shelters without harming nature.

See also 
Italpinas Development Corporation
Primavera Residences

References 

1968 births
Living people
Architects from Rome
Italian expatriates in the Philippines